Crocanthes temeraria is a moth in the family Lecithoceridae. It was described by Edward Meyrick in 1910. It is found on New Guinea.

The forewings are crimson, the dorsal two-thirds from one-fourth to the termen suffused with purplish grey, extended indefinitely to the costa at two-fifths and four-fifths, an irregular yellow-whitish spot towards the dorsum before one-fourth and a moderate subquadrate yellow-whitish spot in the middle of the disc. The costal edge is yellow from two-fifths to three-fourths, and more widely suffused with deep yellow from four-fifths to the apex. The hindwings are pale yellowish tinged throughout with crimson.

References

Moths described in 1910
Crocanthes